Thalman is a surname. Notable people with the surname include:

 Bob Thalman (1922–2012), American football player and coach
 Stefanie Thalman (born 1958), Swiss shoe designer

See also
 Thalmann
 Thälmann